Yunost Stadium (Russian: Юность) is a multi-use stadium in Armavir, Russia.  It is currently used mostly for football matches and is the home ground of FC Armavir.  The stadium holds 5,000 people.

References 

Football venues in Russia
Buildings and structures in Krasnodar Krai